Artur Januszewski  (born 2 July 1976) is a Polish footballer, who last played as a defender for Polish second-tier side Znicz Pruszków.

External links
 
 

1976 births
Living people
People from Działdowo
Sportspeople from Warmian-Masurian Voivodeship
Polish footballers
OKS Stomil Olsztyn players
Dyskobolia Grodzisk Wielkopolski players
Wisła Płock players
Zagłębie Lubin players
Znicz Pruszków players
Association football defenders